The Dacian fortress of Racoș was a Dacian fortified town in Romania.

References

Dacian fortresses in Brașov County
Historic monuments in Brașov County